Jerry on the Job was a comic strip by cartoonist Walter Hoban which was set in a railroad station. Syndicated by William Randolph Hearst's International Feature Service, it ran from 1913 into the 1930s.

Origins
When Hoban was given only a weekend to devise a comic strip, he created Jerry on the Job, about pint-size Jerry Flannigan, initially employed as an office boy and then in a variety of other jobs. The strip was launched on December 29, 1913. Comics historian Don Markstein described Hoban's character and work situations:

Jerry was about the size of a five-year-old who was small for his age, and proportioned like an infant (larger head as compared with the rest of his body) only more so—Jerry was only two heads tall; i.e., the remainder of him, all put together, was about as big as his head... After a year or two, he began moving from job to job. He was a retail clerk, a messenger boy, even a prize fighter (at his size!) and other things before Hoban went off to fight World War I, and the strip went on hiatus. When it returned, Jerry was working at a railroad station under the supervision of Mr. Givney, the station's manager. His job included just about everything that went into making a railroad station function—selling tickets, sweeping floors, toting baggage, running little errands for the boss, etc. Sources of humor included the eccentrics who hung around the station, Mr. Givney's peevishness, and Jerry's own ineptitude. Also, Hoban pioneered in the use of humorous signs posted here and there in the background, a motif also seen in Smokey Stover, Mad and elsewhere. And practically everyone commenting on the strip has praised Hoban for putting his characters through spectacular "takes", that is, exaggerated physical responses to surprising or disconcerting events. He specialized in what some call the "flip take", which left the character undergoing it (usually Givney) as flat on the ground as Charlie Brown after trying to kick Lucy's football.

Sunday strip
The Jerry on the Job Sunday page began in 1919, but on October 19, 1930 it became a topper strip above another Hoban feature, Rainbow Duffy. The daily strip came to an end in 1931, as did Rainbow Duffy and the Sunday strip.

Hoban died in 1939, but his former assistant, Bob Naylor, revived Jerry on the Job as a syndicated strip for King Features, starting on Oct. 21, 1946. However, Naylor's revival was not as successful as Hoban's original strip, and the strip was canceled in 1949.

Animation
From 1916 to 1920, Jerry on the Job was adapted by International Film Service and Bray Studios into a series of animated films, including The Mad Locomotive, Cheating the Piper, A Thrilling Drill, Swinging His Vacation and Without Coal. The animator was Walter Lantz, who recalled, "I animated one 250- foot Jerry on the Job every two weeks."

Cultural legacy
Hoban's work was a strong influence on cartoonist Merrill Blosser and his comic strip Freckles and His Friends, which ran from 1915 to 1971.

During the late 1930s, Hoban's character was used to advertise Post Grape-Nut Flakes. The ads ran on newspaper comic pages and in Woman's Day.

See also
Cheating the Piper - one of the animated films based on the strip

References

External links

Barnacle Press: Jerry on the Job
Jerry on the Job at Lileks.com
1913 comics debuts
1931 comics endings
American comics adapted into films
American comics characters
American comic strips
Comics adapted into animated series
Gag-a-day comics
Male characters in comics
Retail clerks
Comic strips started in the 1910s